Estadio Victoria is sports stadium in the Mexican city of Aguascalientes, Aguascalientes. The stadium opened in 2003 and has a capacity of 23,000 seats. Although the stadium is capable of multi-use, its main use is for soccer games. It is the home stadium of football Club Necaxa, which played in Mexico City at the Estadio Azteca before relocating to Aguascalientes and Estadio Victoria. The stadium is named after a leading brand of beer brewed by Grupo Modelo.

History
Club Necaxa plays at the Estadio Victoria. The first football match at the Estadio Victoria on July 29, 2003, saw Necaxa against Guadalajara and Mexico's national team winning 8–0 over Dominica. Club León had a dispute for its stadium, and is currently playing in the stadium. Their first match here ended 3–2 against Club América.

Casa Club, Necaxa's training facilities in Aguascalientes holds sub-17, sub-20, and Amateur soccer try-outs every year. The club offers other competitive sports such as, basketball, volleyball, and swimming.

Concerts
Maná - December 7, 2003 & February 24, 2008
Luis Miguel - March 21, 2006
Shakira - May 11, 2007
Juanes - October 25, 2008

See also
List of football stadiums in Mexico

References

Sports venues in Aguascalientes
Victoria
Club Necaxa